Deportivo Cali is a professional football club based in Cali, Colombia, which plays in Categoría Primera A.
This chronological list comprises all those who have held the position of manager of the first team of Deportivo Cali since 1912, the date of the first available data for a club manager. Each manager's entry includes his years of tenure, honours won and significant achievements while under his care, where available. Caretaker managers and player-managers are included, where known. As of 2022, Deportivo Cali has had 54 known full-time managers, 8 caretaker managers, and 5 player-managers.

The first known manager for Deportivo Cali in the professional era was Moisés Emilio Reuben, who arrived to the club as a player in 1947 and was appointed as player-manager shortly after, ahead of the team's first participation in the Colombian football championship in 1948.

The most successful Deportivo Cali manager in terms of trophies won is Francisco "Pancho" Villegas, who won three Categoría Primera A trophies in his first five-year tenure as manager. He is also the club's longest-serving manager, having served for five years between 1965 and 1970 and then again for a brief period in 1976.

List of managers 
The complete list of Deportivo Cali managers is shown in the following table:

Italics denote a caretaker manager, PM denotes a player-manager.

References 

Deportivo Cali
Deportivo Cali managers
Deportivo Cali